Hamresanden is a  long beach in the municipality of Kristiansand in Agder county, Norway. The sandy beach is located at Hamre in the district of Tveit, along the Topdalsfjorden at the mouth of the river Topdalselva.  It is located near Kristiansand Airport, Kjevik. Hamresanden goes from Grovikheia in Hånes to Ve.

Hamresanden Camping is a family camp and waterpark located at Hamresanden.  A waterpark was set to open in 2017 under the theme name "Elias" but there has been no recent news as to its construction.

Hamresanden is also a neighborhood and the centrum for the district Tveit. The main road passing through the area is Norwegian National Road 41.

There have been archaeological excavations on Hamresanden, where ancient discoveries have been made.

References

Geography of Kristiansand
Neighbourhoods of Kristiansand
Beaches of Kristiansand
North Sea
Tourism in Kristiansand